Kuruption! is the debut studio album by American rapper Kurupt. It  was released on Antra Records, a label formed after Kurupt left Death Row Records. It was released as a double album and distributed by A&M Records. Originally scheduled for release on September 1, 1998, with the album cover even announcing that date, the album was pushed back to October 6, 1998.

Production
Kurupt was the executive producer of the album. It features guest appearances from numerous rappers from both the East Coast and West Coast, including Daz Dillinger, Noreaga, Tray Deee, Roscoe, and Dr. Dre. Disc one is labeled as "West Coast" and disc two is labeled as "East Coast".

Critical reception

Commercial performance
It peaked at #8 on the Billboard 200 on October 24, 1998,  and sold 82,000 copies in its first week.

Track listing

Charts

Weekly charts

Year-end charts

References

Kurupt albums
1998 debut albums
Albums produced by Battlecat (producer)
Albums produced by Daz Dillinger
Albums produced by Dr. Dre
Albums produced by Easy Mo Bee
Albums produced by Soopafly
Albums produced by Warren G
Albums produced by Studio Ton